天使は瞳の中に (Tenshi wa Hitomi no Naka ni, The angel is in the eyes) is Tamura Yukari's first full-length solo album, released on July 4, 2001.

Track listing
 プロローグ～lalala…～ (Prologue ~lalala...~)
 Lyrics: Karin
 Arrangement and composition: Acryl Vox
 summer melody －album version－
 Lyrics: Karin
 Arrangement and composition: Acryl Vox
 まっすぐな心 (Massugu na Kokoro)
 Lyrics: Akiko Mizusawa
 Composition: pri
 Arrangement: pri and Acryl Vox
 春色の風、今も…。(Haru Iro no kaze, Ima mo....)
 Lyrics: Karin
 Arrangement and composition: Acryl Vox
 in the Oak wood
 Lyrics: Masatomo Ota
 Composition: KUZUKI
 Arrangement: Taka Satou
 スマイルスマイル (Smile Smile)
 Lyrics and composition: Mayumi Minami
 Arrangement: Acryl Vox
 天使じゃなくても (Tenshi Janakutemo)
 Lyrics: Akiko Mizusawa
 Composition: miso
 Arrangement: miso and Acryl Vox
 あの夏を忘れない (Ano Natsu o Wasurenai)
 Lyrics: Karin
 Composition: pri
 Arrangement: pri and Acryl Vox
 A Day Of Little Girl ～姫とウサギとおしゃやべりこねこ～－album version－ (A Day Of Little Girl ~Hime to Usagi to Oshaberi Koneko~ -album version-)
 Lyrics: Karin
 Composition: pri
 Arrangement: Taka Satou
 青空にあいたい －album version－ (Aozora ni Aitai -album version-)
 Lyrics: Karin
 Arrangement and composition: Acryl Vox
  エピローグ (Epilogue)
 Lyrics, arrangement and composition: Acryl Vox

Yukari Tamura albums
2001 albums